Celestial Railroad may refer to:
"The Celestial Railroad," a short story
Jupiter and Lake Worth Railway, nicknamed the "Celestial Railroad"